This list of symphonies by key is a list of symphonies sorted by key. For the least often used keys in orchestral music, the symphony listed might be famous only for being in that key.

C major

In the Classical period, C major was the key most often chosen for symphonies with trumpets and timpani. Even in the Romantic period, with its greater use of minor keys and the ability to use trumpets and timpani in any key, C major remained a very popular choice of key for a symphony. The following list includes only the most famous examples.
Ludwig van Beethoven
Symphony No. 1, Op. 21 (1800)
Georges Bizet
Symphony in C (1855)
Paul Dukas
Symphony in C (1896)
Joseph Haydn
Symphony No. 7, “Le Midi” (1761)
Symphony No. 48, “Maria Theresia” (1769)
Symphony No. 82, “The Bear” (1786)
Symphony No. 97 (1792)
Michael Haydn
 Symphony No. 39, MH 478, Perger 31 (1788)
Franz Liszt
Faust Symphony, S 108 (1857)
Wolfgang Amadeus Mozart
Symphony No. 9, KV 73 (1769)
Symphony No. 16, KV 128 (1772)
Symphony No. 22, KV 162 (1773)
Symphony No. 28, KV 200 (1774)
Symphony No. 34, KV 338 (1780)
Symphony No. 36, "Linz", KV 425 (1783)
Symphony No. 41, "Jupiter", KV 551 (1788)
Sergei Prokofiev
Symphony No. 4 (original version), Op. 47, 1930
Symphony No. 4 (revised version), Op. 112, 1947
Franz Schubert
Symphony No. 6, D. 589
Symphony No. 9, "The Great", D. 944 (1828)
Robert Schumann
Symphony No. 2, Op. 61 (1846)
Dmitri Shostakovich
Symphony No. 7, "Leningrad", Op. 60 (1942)
Jean Sibelius
Symphony No. 3, Op. 52 (1907)
Symphony No. 7, Op. 105 (1924)
Igor Stravinsky
Symphony in C (1940)
Richard Wagner
Symphony in C major, WWV 29 (1832)

C minor 

The key of C minor was, like most other minor keys, associated with the literary Sturm und Drang movement during the Classical period. But ever since Ludwig van Beethoven's famous Symphony No. 5, Op. 67, of 1808, C minor imparts a symphony in the key a character of heroic struggle. Early classical symphonies in the key typically ended in C minor but with a picardy third for the very final chord. Following Beethoven's precedent, most C minor symphonies of the Romantic period end in C major. Another option is to end in E-flat major (the relative key), as Mahler does in his Second Symphony.

Ludwig van Beethoven
Symphony No. 5, op. 67 (1808)
Felix Mendelssohn
Symphony No. 1, Op. 11 (1824)
Johannes Brahms
Symphony No. 1, Op. 68 (1876)
Anton Bruckner
Symphony No. 1 (1868)
Symphony No. 2 (1872)
Symphony No. 8 (1887)
Antonín Dvořák
Symphony No. 1 (1865)
Joseph Haydn
Symphony No. 52
Symphony No. 95
Gustav Mahler
Symphony No. 2 "Resurrection" (1894)
Camille Saint-Saëns
Symphony No. 3 "Organ", Op. 78  (1886)
Franz Schubert
 Symphony No. 4 "Tragic", D 417
Alexander Scriabin
Symphony No. 2, Op. 29 (1901)
Symphony No. 3 "Le Divin Poème", Op. 43 (1904)
Dmitri Shostakovich
Symphony No. 4, Op. 43 (1936)
Symphony No. 8, Op. 65 (1943)
Pyotr Ilyich Tchaikovsky
Symphony No. 2 "Little Russian", Op. 17 (1872)
Alexander Glazunov
Symphony No. 6, Op. 58

C-sharp minor 

Even by Mahler's time, symphonies in C-sharp minor were rare. Some of the works listed below might have no claim to fame besides being in this key.

Arnold Bax
Symphony No. 5
Ernest Bloch
Symphony in C-sharp minor (1902)
Joseph Martin Kraus
Symphony in C-sharp minor, VB 140. Identified by musicologist Bertil H. van Boer in program notes for the Naxos recording as one of only two C-sharp minor symphonies written in the 18th century.
Gustav Mahler
Symphony No. 5 (1902) - Mahler objected to this key assignment, preferring none at all
Nikolai Myaskovsky
Symphony No. 2 (1910–11) 
Sergei Prokofiev
Symphony No. 7, Op. 131 (1952)
Ture Rangström
Symphony No. 1 August Strindberg in Memoriam (1914)
Vissarion Shebalin
Symphony No. 2 (1929 )

D-flat major 

Symphonies in D-flat major are much rarer than those in C-sharp minor and one has to look beyond the standard core repertoire to find them.

Erwin Dressel
Symphony in D-flat major (1928)
 Anastazy Wilhelm Dreszer (1843 - 1907)
 Symphony No. 1, Op. 3 (1865)
Nikolai Myaskovsky
Symphony No. 25, Op. 69 (1945-6)
Ture Rangström
Symphony No. 3, "Song under the Stars" (1929)

D major 

Baroque and Classical symphonies in D major typically used horns in D (reading a seventh down) and when they used trumpets, trumpets in D reading a step up. The following list includes only the most famous of the Classical and Romantic periods.

Ludwig van Beethoven
Symphony No. 2, Op. 36 (1802)
Johannes Brahms
Symphony No. 2, Op. 73 (1877)
Joseph Haydn
Symphony No. 6 "Le Matin" (1761)
Symphony No. 13 (1763)
Symphony No. 70 (1779)
Symphony No. 86 (1786)
Symphony No. 93 (1791)
Symphony No. 96 "Miracle" (1791)
Symphony No. 101 "Clock" (1794)
Symphony No. 104 "London" (1795)
Antonín Dvořák
Symphony No. 6, Op. 60, B. 112 (1880)
Gustav Mahler
Symphony No. 1 (1888)
Symphony No. 9 (1909)
Wolfgang Amadeus Mozart
Symphony No. 4, KV 19 (1765)
Symphony No. 7, KV 45 (1768)
Symphony No. 8, KV 48 (1768)
Symphony No. 11, KV 84 (1770)
Symphony No. 20, KV 133 (1772)
Symphony No. 23, KV 181 (1773)
Symphony No. 30, KV 202 (1774)
Symphony No. 31 "Paris", KV 297 (1778)
Symphony No. 35 "Haffner", KV 385 (1782)
Symphony No. 38 "Prague", KV 504 (1786)
Franz Schubert
Symphony No. 1, D 82
Symphony No. 3, D 200
Symphony No. 10, D 936A (unfinished)
Jean Sibelius
Symphony No. 2, Op. 43 (1902)
Sergei Prokofiev
Symphony No. 1 "Classical", Op. 25  (1917)
Johann Stamitz
Symphony in D major, Op. 3, No. 2
Pyotr Ilyich Tchaikovsky
Symphony No. 3 "Polish", Op. 29 (1875)
Ralph Vaughan Williams
Symphony No. 5 - nominally in the key
Alexander Glazunov
Symphony No. 3, Op. 33

D minor 

Baroque and Classical symphonies in D minor usually used 2 horns in F (whereas for most other minor keys 2 or 4 horns were used, half in the tonic and half in the relative major). Michael Haydn's Symphony No. 29 in D minor is notable for using two trumpets in D (the horns are in F but change to D for the coda of the finale). In the Romantic era, D minor symphonies, like symphonies in almost any other key, used horns in F and trumpets in B-flat.

Ludwig van Beethoven
Symphony No. 9 "Choral", Op. 125  (1824)
Havergal Brian
Symphony No. 1 "Gothic" (1927)
Robert Schumann
Symphony No. 4, Op. 120 (1841)
Anton Bruckner
Symphony No. 0 (1869)
Symphony No. 3 (1873, 1877, 1891)
Symphony No. 9 (1896, unfinished)
Antonín Dvořák
Symphony No. 4, Op. 13, B. 41 (1874)
Symphony No. 7, Op. 70, B. 141 (1885)
César Franck
Symphony in D minor
Alexander Glazunov
Symphony No. 9 (1910, unfinished)
Joseph Haydn
Symphony No. 26 "Lamentatione" (1768)
Symphony No. 80 (1784)
Michael Haydn
Symphony No. 29 (1784)
Gustav Mahler   
Symphony No. 3 (1896) 
Sergei Rachmaninoff
Symphony No. 1, Op. 13 (1895)
Felix Mendelssohn
Symphony No. 5 "Reformation", Op. 107 (1830)
Martin Scherber
Symphony No. 1 (1938)
Dmitri Shostakovich
Symphony No. 5, Op. 47 (1937)
Symphony No. 12, Op. 112 (1961)
Ralph Vaughan Williams
Symphony No. 8 (1955)

E-flat major 

Elfrida Andrée
 Symphony No. 2
Ludwig van Beethoven
Symphony No. 3 "Eroica", Op. 55  (1804)
Alexander Borodin
Symphony No. 1 (before 1869)
Anton Bruckner
Symphony No. 4 "Romantic" (1874)
Antonín Dvořák
Symphony No. 3 (1873)
Edward Elgar
Symphony No. 2, Op. 63 (1911)
Alexander Glazunov
Symphony No. 4, Op. 48
 Symphony No. 8, Op. 83
Karl Goldmark
Rustic Wedding Symphony, Op. 26 (1875)
Joseph Haydn
Symphony No. 22 "The Philosopher" (1764)
Symphony No. 99 (1793)
Symphony No. 103 "Drumroll" (1795)
Robert Schumann
Symphony No. 3 "Rhenish", Op. 97 (1850)
Jean Sibelius
Symphony No. 5, Op. 82 (1915)
Gustav Mahler
Symphony No. 8 "Symphony of a Thousand" (1907)
Wolfgang Amadeus Mozart
Symphony No. 1, KV 16 (1764)
Symphony No. 3, KV 18 (1765)
Symphony No. 19, KV 132 (1772)
Symphony No. 39, KV 543 (1788)
Dmitri Shostakovich
Symphony No. 3 "The First of May", Op. 20  (1931)
Symphony No. 9, Op. 70 (1945)
Johann Stamitz
Symphony in E-flat major, Op. 11, No. 3

E-flat minor 

The two examples of symphonies in E-flat minor that come up most readily are both Sixth Symphonies by Soviet composers.

Nikolai Myaskovsky
Symphony No. 6, Op. 23 (1921-3)
Sergei Prokofiev
Symphony No. 6, Op. 111 (1947)

E major 

In the classical period, symphonies in E major used horns in E but no trumpets. 
Joseph Haydn
Symphony No. 12 (1763)
Symphony No. 29 (1765)
Max Bruch
Symphony No. 3
Joachim Raff
Symphony No. 5 "Lenore", Op.177 (1872)
Anton Bruckner
Symphony No. 7 (1883)
Alexander Scriabin
Symphony No. 1, Op. 26 (1900)
Franz Schubert
Symphony No. 7, D 729
Alexander Glazunov
Symphony No. 1, Op. 5

E minor 

Amy Beach
Gaelic Symphony, Op. 32 (1894)
Johannes Brahms
Symphony No. 4, Op. 98 (1885)
Antonín Dvořák
Symphony No. 9 "From the New World", Op. 95, B. 178 (1893)
Joseph Haydn
Symphony No. 44 "Trauer" (1770)
Pyotr Ilyich Tchaikovsky
Symphony No. 5, Op. 64 (1888)
Jean Sibelius
Symphony No. 1, Op. 39 (1898)
Gustav Mahler
Symphony No. 7 (1906)
Sergei Rachmaninoff
Symphony No. 2, Op. 27 (1907)
Dmitri Shostakovich
Symphony No. 10, Op. 93 (1948)
Ralph Vaughan Williams
Symphony No. 6 (1948)
Symphony No. 9 (1957)

F major 

Joseph Haydn
Symphony No. 89 (1787)
Ludwig van Beethoven
Symphony No. 6 "Pastoral", Op. 68 (1808)
Symphony No. 8, Op. 93 (1812)
Alexander Glazunov
Symphony No. 7 "Pastoral", Op. 77
Joachim Raff
Symphony No. 3 "Im Walde", Op. 153 (1870)
Antonín Dvořák
Symphony No. 5, Op. 76, B. 54 (1875)
Johannes Brahms
Symphony No. 3, Op. 90 (1883)
Zdeněk Fibich
Symphony No. 1, Op. 17 (1883)
Nikolai Myaskovsky
Symphony No. 16 "Aviation", Op. 39 (1935-1936)

F minor 

Even in the Sturm und Drang era, F minor was not a frequent choice for a minor key symphony, though Haydn did contribute one.

Anton Bruckner
Study Symphony in F minor
Joseph Haydn
Symphony No. 49 "La Passione" (1768)
Richard Strauss
Symphony No. 2, Op. 12 (1884)
Pyotr Ilyich Tchaikovsky
Symphony No. 4, Op. 36 (1878)
Sir Charles Villiers Stanford
Symphony No. 3 "The Irish", Op. 28 (1887)
Dmitri Shostakovich
Symphony No. 1, Op. 10 (1925)
Ralph Vaughan Williams
Symphony No. 4 (1934)
Martin Scherber
Symphony No. 2 (1951–52)

F-sharp major 

The only notable (completed) symphony written explicitly in F-sharp major is Erich Wolfgang Korngold's Symphony in F-sharp major, Op. 40 of 1950.

Gustav Mahler's unfinished Tenth Symphony is in this key. So is Olivier Messiaen's Turangalîla-Symphonie, as several of its movements including the finale are in that key, although it could be excluded on the grounds that it is very far from traditionally tonal.

F-sharp minor 

Though it has just three sharps and its relative major was used somewhat frequently, F-sharp minor was an unusual choice of key in the Classical era.

George Frederick Bristow
Symphony in F-sharp minor, Op. 26
Alexander Glazunov
Symphony No. 2, Op. 16
Joseph Haydn
Symphony No. 45 "Farewell" (1772)
Myaskovsky
Symphony No. 21
Dora Pejačević
Symphony (1917)

G major 

In the Baroque and Classical periods, G major was one of the most often used keys. Classical symphonies in G major typically had horns in G, but no trumpets. In the Romantic era, the key was less often used. The following list only includes the most famous works.

Antonín Dvořák
Symphony No. 8, Op. 88, B. 163 (1889)
George Dyson
Symphony in G major (1937)
Joseph Haydn
Symphony No. 8 "Le Soir" (1761)
Symphony No. 88 (late 1780s)
Symphony No. 92 "Oxford" (1791)
Symphony No. 94 "Surprise" (1791)
Symphony No. 100 "Military" (1794)
Wolfgang Amadeus Mozart
Symphony No. 10, KV 74 (1770)
Symphony No. 12, KV 110 (1771)
Symphony No. 15, KV 124 (1772)
Symphony No. 17, KV 129 (1772)
Symphony No. 27, KV 199 (1773)
Symphony No. 32, KV 318 (1779)
Gustav Mahler
Symphony No. 4 (1901)
Johann Stamitz
Symphony in G major "Mannheim No. 1"
Ralph Vaughan Williams
Symphony No. 2 "A London Symphony" (1914)

G minor 

G minor was a frequent choice for minor key symphonies. In the Classical period, symphonies in G minor almost always used four horns, two in G and two in B-flat alto.

Joseph Haydn
Symphony No. 39 (1767)
Symphony No. 83, The Hen (1785)
Wolfgang Amadeus Mozart
Symphony No. 25, KV 183 (1773)
Symphony No. 40, KV 550 (1788)
Pyotr Ilyich Tchaikovsky
Symphony No. 1 "Winter Daydreams" (1866)
Carl Nielsen
Symphony No. 1 (1891)
Dmitri Shostakovich
Symphony No. 11 "The Year 1905", Op. 103 (1957)

A-flat major 

Although A-flat major was chosen often enough for inner movements of symphonies in other keys (most notably slow movements of C minor symphonies), there are very few symphonies with A-flat major as their main key.

Edward Elgar
Symphony No. 1, Op. 55 (1908)
Jef van Hoof
Symphony No. 2 (1941)
Johann Baptist Wanhal
Symphony in A-flat major, Bryan Ab1

G-sharp minor 

Because A-flat minor has seven flats in its key signature, composers usually use the enharmonic equivalent G-sharp minor, which only has five sharps.  It is infrequent even in piano music, and even rarer in orchestral music in general.

Nikolai Myaskovsky
 Symphony No. 17
Elliot Goldenthal
 Symphony in G-sharp minor

A major 

The following list only includes the most famous A major symphonies.

Ludwig van Beethoven
Symphony No. 7, Op. 92 (1812)
Anton Bruckner
Symphony No. 6 (1881)
Joseph Haydn
Symphony No. 59, "Fire" (before 1769)
Symphony No. 64, "Tempora mutantur" (1778)
Symphony No. 87 (1785/6)
Felix Mendelssohn
Symphony No. 4 "Italian", Op. 90 (1833)
Wolfgang Amadeus Mozart
Symphony No. 14, KV 114 (1771)
Symphony No. 21, KV 134 (1772)
Symphony No. 29, KV 201 (1774)
Dmitri Shostakovich
Symphony No. 15, Op. 141 (1971)
Johann Stamitz
Symphony in A major "Mannheim No. 2"
Richard Wetz
Symphony No. 2, Op. 47 (1921)

A minor 

Alexander Borodin
Symphony No. 3 (1886–1887, unfinished)
Felix Mendelssohn
Symphony No. 3 "Scottish", Op. 56 (1842)
Gustav Mahler
Symphony No. 6 "Tragic" (1904)
Jean Sibelius
Symphony No. 4, Op. 63 (1911)
Sergei Rachmaninoff
Symphony No. 3, Op. 44 (1936)
Stephen Brown
Symphony, The Northern Journey (1986–89, revision 1992)

B-flat major 

Haydn's Symphony No. 98 is credited as the first symphony written in B-flat major in which trumpet and timpani parts are included. Actually, his brother Michael Haydn had written one such symphony earlier, No. 36. However, Joseph still gets credit for writing the timpani part at actual pitch with an F major key signature (instead of transposing with a C major key signature), a procedure that made sense since he limited that instrument to the tonic and dominant pitches. Many editions of the work, however, use no key signature and specify the instrument as "Timpani in B-flat - F." (Note that in German, the pitch B-flat is called "B", and B natural is "H", thus the specification for timpani in a B-flat work could be written "Pauken in B. - F.")

Ludwig van Beethoven
Symphony No. 4, Op. 60 (1806)
Anton Bruckner
Symphony No. 5 (1876)
Ernest Chausson
Symphony in B-flat, Op. 20 (1890)
Antonín Dvořák
Symphony No. 2 (1865)
Alexander Glazunov
Symphony No. 5, Op. 48
Joseph Haydn
Symphony No. 85 "La Reine" (1785/6)
Symphony No. 98 (1792)
Symphony No. 102 (1794/5)
Andrea Luchesi
Symphony in B-flat major (ca.1770)
Wolfgang Amadeus Mozart
Symphony No. 24, KV 182 (1773)
Symphony No. 33, KV 319 (1779)
Franz Schubert
Symphony No. 2, D 125 (1815)
Symphony No. 5, D 485 (1816)
Robert Schumann
Symphony No. 1 "Spring", Op. 38 (1841)
Sergei Prokofiev
Symphony No. 5, Op. 100 (1944)
Johann Stamitz
Symphony in B-flat major "Mannheim No. 3"

B-flat minor 

B-flat minor occurs often enough in the piano repertoire, much less so in the orchestral repertoire. Even allowing little-known works, the list is rather short.

Havergal Brian
Symphony No. 8 (1949)
Frederic Hymen Cowen
Symphony No. 4
Jānis Ivanovs
Symphony No. 1 (1933)
Dmitry Kabalevsky
Symphony No. 3, Op. 22 (1933)
Miloslav Kabeláč
Symphony No. 5 Dramatic, Op. 41 (1960)
Tikhon Khrennikov
Symphony No. 1, Op. 4 (1933-5)
Sergei Lyapunov
Symphony No. 2, Op. 66
Albéric Magnard
Symphony No. 3, Op. 11 (1896)
Nikolai Myaskovsky
Symphony No. 11, Op. 34 (1932)
Symphony No. 13, Op. 36 (1933)
Harald Sæverud
Symphony No. 3, Op. 5
Dmitri Shostakovich
Symphony No. 13 "Babi Yar", Op. 113 (1962)
Maximilian Steinberg
Symphony No. 2, Op. 8 (1909) In Memoriam Rimsky-Korsakov
Richard Wetz
Symphony No. 3, Op.48 (1922)
William Walton
Symphony No. 1 (1932–35)

B major 

Haydn's use of B major in his Symphony No. 46 was deemed "extraordinary" for a symphony in the 18th century.

Joseph Haydn
Symphony No. 46 (1772)
Erich Wolfgang Korngold
 Sinfonietta, Op. 5 (1912)
Georg Matthias Monn
Sinfonia (1740s)
Dmitri Shostakovich
Symphony No. 2 "To October", Op. 14  (1927)

B minor 

B minor is the key of some famous symphonies in the repertoire, as well as a few lesser known ones.

Alexander Borodin
Symphony No. 2 (1876)
Wilhelm Furtwängler
Symphony No. 1 (1941)
Ignacy Jan Paderewski
Symphony in B minor (Polonia), Op. 24 (1908)
Martin Scherber
Symphony No. 3 (Die Russische) (1952–55)
Franz Schubert
Symphony No. 8 (Unfinished), D. 759 (1822, inc.)
Dmitri Shostakovich
Symphony No. 6, Op. 54 (1939)
Pyotr Ilyich Tchaikovsky
Manfred Symphony, Op. 58 (1885)
Symphony No. 6 (Pathétique), Op. 74 (1893)
Reinhold Glière
Symphony No. 3 "Ilya Muromets", Op. 42 (1911)

References

 
Symphonies